Oleksandr Bahach born 21 November 1966 in village of Matusiv) is a former Ukrainian shot putter, an athlete of the Central Sports Club of the Armed Forces of Ukraine.

During his career he won bronze medals at the Olympic Games and World Championships. Having originally won the gold medal at the 1997 World Championships, he failed a drug test for ephedrine and lost the medal. He had previously served a two-year suspension after testing positive for testosterone in 1989.

Career 
Summer Olympic Games:
1996 Atlanta - bronze
World Championships:
1993 Stuttgart - bronze
1999 Seville - bronze
European Championships:
1994 Helsinki - bronze
1998 Budapest - gold
European Indoor Championships:
1992 Genoa - gold
1994 Paris - gold

See also
List of doping cases in sport

External links 

Sporting Heroes

1966 births
Living people
Armed Forces sports society (Ukraine) athletes
Soviet male shot putters
Ukrainian male shot putters
Athletes (track and field) at the 1996 Summer Olympics
Olympic athletes of Ukraine
Olympic bronze medalists for Ukraine
Doping cases in athletics
Ukrainian sportspeople in doping cases
World Athletics Championships medalists
European Athletics Championships medalists
European champions for Ukraine
Medalists at the 1996 Summer Olympics
Olympic bronze medalists in athletics (track and field)
Athletes stripped of World Athletics Championships medals
World Athletics Indoor Championships winners
Sportspeople from Cherkasy Oblast